Albert-Antoine Cimochowski, called Albert Cim, (22 October 1845 – 8 May 1924) was a French novelist, literary critic and bibliographer.

Biography 
Born to a French mother and a Polish officer who fled to France after the 1830 November Uprising, Albert Cimochowski entered in Paris a public service career for the Postes et télégraphes in 1861 and, under the name Albert Cim, began in journalism by writing articles on philology, criticism and bibliography, pieces that were quickly noticed. He collaborated with many newspapers including "lights" ones (La Gaudriole) and held the Revue littéraire column of Le Radical from 1881 to 1894, then of the National from 1895 to 1897. He also participated in writing the Dictionnaire de la langue française by Littré. Meanwhile, he published books for children and novels, which earned him to be five-time winner of the Académie française, and documentary, literary and bibliographic studies. In 1896, he was appointed a librarian by the Under Secretary for Postes and telegraphs. He was also a member of the Société des gens de lettres of which he was twice the vice-president.

Works 

1880: Jeunesse, mœurs de province
1885: Service de nuit
1887: Amis d'enfance 
1887: Institution de demoiselles, mœurs parisiennes 
1888: Deux malheureuses Text online
1888: La Rue des Trois Belles
1889: Un Coin de province
1890: Les Prouesses d'une fille
1891: Bas-Bleus 
1892: Bonne Amie
1893: En pleine gloire, histoire d'une mystification
1893: Spectacles enfantins
1894: Demoiselles à marier
1894: Joyeuse Ville
1894: Histoire d'un baiser Text online
1895: Fils unique. Le neveu de Mlle Papillon Text online
1896: Le Célèbre Barastol, vie et aventures d'un commis voyageur
1896: Grand'-Mère et petit-fils 
1896: Fils unique. Le Neveu de Mlle Papillon
1897: Césarin, histoire d'un vagabond Text online 
1898: La Petite Fée
1898: Jeunes Amours
1899: Émancipées 
1900: Farceurs
1900: Mademoiselle Cœur d'Ange, histoire d'une tante, de ses neveux, de ses nièces et de ses bêtes
1902: Une bibliothèque : l'art d'acheter les livres, de les classer, de les conserver et de s'en servir Text online
1903: Le Dîner des gens de lettres : souvenirs littéraires Text online
1903: Amateurs et voleurs de livres : emprunteurs indélicats, voleurs par amour des livres, voleurs par amour de l'argent ; vols dans les bibliothèques publiques, chez les éditeurs, libraires, bouquinistes, etc. (Reprint: Ides et Calendes, Neuchâtel, 1998).
1903: Le Petit Léveillé Text online
1904: Le Roman d'un bon garçon 
1904: Contes et souvenirs de mon pays Text online
1905: Mes amis et moi
1905–1908: Le Livre : historique, fabrication, achat, classement, usage et entretien (5 volumes)
1906: Les Quatre fils Hémon
1910: Le Chansonnier Émile Debraux, roi de la goguette, 1796-1831
1910: Bureaux et bureaucrates, mémoires d'un employé des PTT
1911: La Revanche d'Absalon
1912: Disparu ! Histoire d'un enfant perdu
1912: Mes vacances : chasse à l'ours ; deux amis, le père Laverdure et son chien Finaud ; la brouette de mon grand-père ; pensionnaires !… etc., etc.
1913: Le Gros Lot 
1913: Mystificateurs et mystifiés célèbres
1914: Entre camarades
1919: Les Coulisses du monde littéraire : Nina de Villard et son salon
1919: Les Femmes et les livres
1920: . Curiosités et singularités, bévues et lapsus, etc. Text online
1921: Nouvelles Récréations littéraires et historiques. Curiosités et Singularités. Bévues et Lapsus, etc. Historiens. Philosophes. Orateurs. Médecins. Politiciens. Journalistes. Ecclésiastiques. Femmes écrivains. Appendice. Coquilles typographiques
1921: Deux cousins
1923: Petit Manuel de l'amateur de livres (multiples formats  Text online)
1924: Amis d'enfance
1924: Le Travail intellectuel. L'ordre, la clarté, l'écriture, manies des écrivains Text online

Sources 
 Biographical elements after C.-E. Curinier, Dictionnaire national des contemporains, vol. II, 1899-1919, (p. 329–330)

External links 
 Albert Cim on data.bnf.fr
 Albert Cim on Wikisource

19th-century French writers
20th-century French non-fiction writers
French literary critics
French bibliographers
1845 births
People from Bar-le-Duc
1924 deaths